Louis Marcel Brillouin (19 December 1854 – 16 June 1948) was a French physicist and mathematician.

Born in Saint-Martin-lès-Melle, Deux-Sèvres, France, his father was a painter who moved to Paris when Marcel was a boy. There he attended the Lycée Condorcet. The Brillouin family returned to Saint-Martin-lès-Melle during the Franco-Prussian War of 1870 to escape the fighting. There he spent time teaching himself from his grandfather's philosophy books.  After the war, he returned to Paris and entered the École Normale Supérieure in 1874 and graduated in 1878. He became a physics assistant to Eleuthere Mascart (his future father-in-law) at the Collège de France, while at the same time working for his doctorates in mathematics and physics, which he gained in 1880 and 1882, respectively. Brillouin then held successive posts as assistant professor of physics at universities in Nancy, Dijon and Toulouse before returning to the École Normale Supérieure in Paris in 1888. Later, he was Professor of Mathematical Physics at the Collège de France from 1900 to retirement in 1931.

In 1911 he was one of only six French physicists invited to the first Solvay Conference. He was awarded the Prix La Caze for 1912.
Brillouin was elected to the Académie des Sciences in 1921. He was an officer of the Legion of Honour.

During his career he was the author of over 200 experimental and theoretic papers on a wide range of topics which include the kinetic theory of gases, viscosity, thermodynamics, electricity, and the physics of melting conditions. Most notably he:
built a new model of the Eötvös balance,
wrote on Helmholtz flow and the stability of aircraft, 
worked on a theory of the tides.

Brillouin died in Paris (16 June 1948). His son Léon Brillouin, also had a prominent career in physics.

Further reading
 Marcel Brillouin (1904).  Propagation de l'Électricité:  Histoire et Théorie (Paris).
 Marcel Brillouin (1906-1907).  Leçons sur la Viscosité des Liquides et des Gaz (2 vols., Paris).
 Paul Langevin, Allocution au Jubilé scientifique de Marcel Brillouin, 1935.
 Henri Villat (1935).  Jubilé de M. Brillouin pour son 80ème anniversaire (2 vols., Paris). 
 Henri Villat (1948).  Notice nécrologique sur Marcel Brillouin.  Comptes Rendus de l'Académie des Sciences, vol. 226, no. 25, p. 2029. .
 Léon Brillouin (1981).  Brillouin, Marcel Louis.  In Dictionary of Scientific Biography ed. by C. C. Gillispie, vol. 2 (Charles Scribner's Sons, New York).

References

External links
Biography at the School of Mathematics and Statistics, University of St Andrews, Scotland

1854 births
1948 deaths
French physicists
19th-century French mathematicians
École Normale Supérieure alumni
Academic staff of the Collège de France
Lycée Condorcet alumni
Officiers of the Légion d'honneur
Members of the French Academy of Sciences
20th-century French mathematicians